Cynthia Nicholas (born 5 September 1937) is an Australian sprint canoeist who competed in the early 1960s. She was eliminated in the repechage of the K-2 500 m event at the 1960 Summer Olympics in Rome.

References

Sports-reference.com profile

1937 births
Australian female canoeists
Canoeists at the 1960 Summer Olympics
Living people
Olympic canoeists of Australia